Mount Melleray, also spelled Mountmelleray, is a townland situated in the Knockmealdown Mountains near Cappoquin, County Waterford, Ireland. It is in the civil parish of Lismore and Mocollop in the historical barony of Coshmore and Coshbride. It is home to the Cistercian monastery, Mount Melleray Abbey, and a Scout centre operated by Scouting Ireland.

Abbey

The townland is home to Mount Melleray Abbey, a Cistercian monastery, the first such monastery to be built in Ireland after the Reformation. Built in the early 19th century, it is now home to a community of Trappist monks.

Scout centre
A Scout centre run by Scouting Ireland, formerly Scouting Ireland (CSI), is also situated at Mount Melleray. The centre, which was a former monastic boarding house acquired in 1979, includes a museum documenting the history of Scouting in Ireland. The centre is made up of a small camping field adjoining a large dormitory centre which also contains a climbing wall. Mount Melleray hosted the last Melvin All Ireland Scoutcraft competition of Scouting Ireland (CSI) in 2003. , the centre had been closed for renovations since March 2019.

References

External links 
 Mount Melleray Scout Centre website (archived 2019)

Townlands of County Waterford
Campsites of Scouting Ireland
Melleray